This is a list of European (Portuguese and Dutch) colonial administrators responsible for the territory of Portuguese Angola, an area equivalent to modern-day Republic of Angola.

List

(Dates in italics indicate de facto continuation of office)

For continuation after independence, see: List of presidents of Angola

See also
 Colonial history of Angola

Sources
 http://www.rulers.org/rula2.html#angola
 http://www.worldstatesmen.org/Angola.html
 African States and Rulers, John Stewart, McFarland
 Guinness Book of Kings, Rulers & Statesmen, Clive Carpenter, Guinness Superlatives Ltd
 Heads of State and Government, 2nd Edition, John V da Graca, MacMillan Press 2000

Political history of Portugal
List
Angola